Kawakawa may refer to:

 Kawakawa, New Zealand, a town
 Kawakawa River
 Kawakawa (fern) (Blechnum fluviatile)
 Kawakawa (fish) (Euthynnus affinis)
 Kawakawa (tree) (Macropiper excelsum)

See also
 Kawa (disambiguation)
 Kavakava